Bisu is a Loloish language of Thailand, with a couple thousand speakers in China. Varieties are Bisu proper (Mbisu) and Laomian (Guba), considered by Pelkey to be distinct languages.

The Laomian are classified within the Lahu ethnic group; the Lahu proper call them the "Lawmeh".

Distribution
According to Bisuyu Yanjiu 毕苏语研究 (2002), there are over 5,000 Bisu speakers in Yunnan, China, and a total of nearly 10,000 Bisu speakers in all countries combined. Within Yunnan, it is spoken mostly in Pu'er Prefecture, as well as neighboring parts of Xishuangbanna.

Lancang County 澜沧县
Zhutang 竹塘乡
Dazhai 大寨, Laomian 老面 (see Laomian language)
Laba 拉巴乡
Donglang 东朗乡
Fubang 富邦乡
Menghai County 勐海县
Mengzhe 勐遮乡
Laopinzhai 老品寨 (see Laopin language)
Ximeng County 西盟县
Lisuo 力锁乡
Menglian County 孟连县
Nanya 南雅乡

In Thailand, two dialects of Bisu are spoken in the following villages of Phan District, Chiang Rai Province (Bisuyu Yanjiu 2002:152).
Dialect 1: Huai Chomphu village (also called Ban Huaisan) and Doi Pui village
Dialect 2: Phadaeng village

Another variety of Bisu differing from the Phayao variety is spoken in Takɔ (Ban Thako), Mae Suai District, Chiang Rai Province.

In Laos, Bisu (also called Lao-Phai) is spoken in Phudokcham village, Phongxaly District.
In Myanmar, Bisu is spoken in three or two villages of Shan State, and Bisu speakers live alongside Pyen speakers

Orthography
In Thailand, the Bisu language is written with the Thai script.

Consonants

Vowels
There is no different meaning between long and short vowels. However, check syllables may sound shorter than non-checked ones when speaking. Thai standard uses only long vowels.
 -า – a – [a]
 -ี – i – [i]
 -ือ/-ื – ɨ – [ɨ~ʉ]
 -ู – u – [u]
 เ- – e – [e]
 แ- – ɛ – [ɛ~æ]
 โ- – o – [o]
 -อ – ɔ – [ɔ]
 เ-อ/เ-ิ – ə – [ə]
 เ-ีย – ia – [ia]

Tones
 – – no mark – mid
 -่ – grave accent – low
 -้ – acute accent – high

References

External links
 The New Testament in Bisu on Bible.com

Southern Loloish languages
Languages of Thailand
Languages of Laos
Languages of China